William Fitzhugh (1741–1809) was an American planter, legislator, and patriot.

William Fitzhugh may also refer to:

William FitzHugh, 4th Baron FitzHugh (1399–1452), English nobleman and member of parliament
William Henry Fitzhugh (1792–1830), Virginia planter and politician
William W. Fitzhugh (born 1943), American archaeologist and anthropologist

See also
W. Fitzhugh Brundage (born 1959), American historian
William Henry Fitzhugh Lee (1837–1891), American planter, general, and politician